Ashley Schutte Buys (born 1 June 1979) is a South African rugby union footballer. He plays mostly as a tighthead prop. He represents the Pumas in the Currie Cup and Vodacom Cup having previously played for the SWD Eagles and South African Barbarians.

References

External links

itsrugby.co.uk profile

Living people
1979 births
South African rugby union players
Rugby union props
Pumas (Currie Cup) players
SWD Eagles players
People from George, South Africa
Rugby union players from the Western Cape